The 2011 VMI Keydets football team represented the Virginia Military Institute during the 2011 NCAA Division I FCS football season as a member of the Big South Conference. The 2011 season was the Keydets 121st season overall, and their 9th in the Big South. They finished with a 2–9 overall record and 2–4 in the Big South under 4th year head coach Sparky Woods. They played their games at Alumni Memorial Field, as they have since 1962.

Schedule

Game summaries

Delaware State

William & Mary

Richmond

Akron

Coastal Carolina

Charleston Southern

Stony Brook
Homecoming

The Citadel

Liberty

Presbyterian

Gardner-Webb

References

VMU
VMI Keydets football seasons
VMI Keydets football